The Tjakrabirawa Regiment was the presidential bodyguard unit of the former Indonesian President Sukarno. It was disbanded in 1966 because of its involvement in the coup attempt of the 30 September Movement.

History 
The Tjakrabirawa Regiment was formed on 6 June 1962 by President Sukarno at the suggestion of army officers after attempts to assassinate the head of state, most recently on 14 May that year. Its primary task was to provide security for the president and his family. Security for the president consisted of individual protection and area protection. Its personnel were recruited from all branches of the Indonesian military, such as the Army Raiders and the Army Parachute Commandos, the Navy Commando Operations Corps (KKO), the Air Force Rapid Action Force (PGT) and Police Mobile Brigade (BRIMOB). The first commandant and executive officer were Brigadier General M. Sabur and Colonel Maulwi Saelan. President Sukarno gave the name "Tjakrabirawa" after Krishna's fictional sacred weapon in wayang mythology. The regiment badge was a golden "Cakra" in a dark red pentagonal field. Its members wore a brick red beret, pushed to the left.

On 30 September 1965, Lieutenant Colonel Untung, commander of one of the regiment's three battalions, led the 30 September Movement coup attempt. Tjakrabirawa personnel were involved in the kidnapping and subsequent murder of six senior generals. The coup failed, and Untung was later sentenced to death for his actions. In the months following the coup attempt, the army encouraged a series of anti-Sukarno demonstrations in Jakarta. During a large demonstration by students near the presidential palace on 24 February 1966, Tjakrabirawa  soldiers opened fire, killing a female high school student and a male university student, Arif Rahman Hakim.

Two months after the issuing of the  11 March 1966 Order authorizing Maj. Gen Suharto to take all measures necessary to guarantee security, there were purges in the Air Force, Navy and Police, and the Tjakrabirawa regiment was disbanded on 28 March. Its members were hunted down by the Army, interrogated, tortured and jailed. Those deemed to have been directly involved in the 30 September Movement were executed. Presidential guard functions were subsequently taken over by the Military Police Command of the Armed Forces in early 1966, called Satgas Pomad Para. Subsequently, the Presidential Security Force ("Pasukan Pengamanan Presiden") was formed by New Order Government and is still responsible for presidential protection, as well as for honor guard duties in the capital.

Organization
The Tjakrabirawa organization consisted of:
 HQ and Services Detachment
 Special Security Detachment
 Personal Security Detachment
 Honor Guard Detachment
 Detachment HQ
 1st Honor Guard Battalion (consisting of Army personnel)
 2nd Honor Guard Battalion (consisting of Navy personnel)
 3rd Honor Guard Battalion (consisting of Air Force personnel)
 4th Honor Guard Battalion (consisting of Police personnel)
 Presidential Band
 Support Detachment

References

Bibliography
 
 
 
 
 
 
 
 
 

Sukarno
Transition to the New Order
Military units and formations of Indonesia 
Guards regiments
Military units and formations disestablished in 1966